Acourtia runcinata, the featherleaf desertpeony or desert paeonia, is a North American species of plant in the family Asteraceae. It is native to northern Mexico (Chihuahua, Coahuila, Hidalgo, Nuevo León, San Luis Potosí, Tamaulipas) and also to the state of Texas in the United States.

References

Flora of Texas
Nassauvieae
Plants described in 1852
Flora of Northeastern Mexico